2882 Tedesco, provisional designation , is a Themistian asteroid from the outer regions of the asteroid belt, approximately  in diameter. It was discovered on 26 July 1981, by astronomer Edward Bowell at the Anderson Mesa Station near Flagstaff, Arizona. The likely elongated C-type asteroid has a rotation period of 19.8 hours. It was named for American astronomer Ed Tedesco.

Orbit and classification 

Tedesco is a Themistian asteroid that belongs to the Themis family, one of the largest families of carbonaceous asteroids in the main belt. The family is named after its parent body 24 Themis.

Tedesco orbits the Sun in the outer asteroid belt at a distance of 2.5–3.8 AU once every 5 years and 7 months (2,045 days; semi-major axis of 3.15 AU). Its orbit has an eccentricity of 0.19 and an inclination of 0° with respect to the ecliptic.

Physical characteristics 

Tedesco has been characterized as a carbonaceous C-type asteroid by both Pan-STARRS and SDSS, and agrees with the Themis family's overall spectral type.

Rotation period 

In June 2014, a rotational lightcurve of Tedesco was obtained from photometric observations by Maurice Clark at Texas Tech's Preston Gott Observatory. Lightcurve analysis gave a well-defined rotation period of 19.805 hours with a high brightness amplitude of 0.76 magnitude, indicative of a non-spheroidal shape. A previous measurement from October 2010 by astronomers at the Palomar Transient Factory in California gave a similar period of 19.815 with an equally high brightness variation of 0.65 magnitude.().

Diameter and albedo 

According to the survey carried out by the NEOWISE mission of NASA's Wide-field Infrared Survey Explorer, Tedesco measures between 20.89 and 24.93 kilometers in diameter and its surface has an albedo between 0.06 and 0.084, while the Collaborative Asteroid Lightcurve Link assumes an albedo of 0.08 and calculates a diameter of 21.48 kilometers based on an absolute magnitude of 11.7.

Naming 

This minor planet was named after Edward Francis Tedesco (Ed Tedesco), a planetary scientist at the Jet Propulsion Laboratory, who analyzed observations with the Infrared Astronomical Satellite in the 1980s. His studies included photometric observations of minor planets, their pole and shape determination, as well as the compositional structure of the asteroid belt. The official naming citation was published by the Minor Planet Center on 17 February 1984.

References

External links 
 Ed Tedesco at PSI 
 Asteroid Lightcurve Database (LCDB), query form (info )
 Dictionary of Minor Planet Names, Google books
 Discovery Circumstances: Numbered Minor Planets (1)-(5000) – Minor Planet Center
 
 

002882
Discoveries by Edward L. G. Bowell
Named minor planets
19810726